Tom Jan Hiariej (born 25 July 1988) is a Dutch professional footballer who is currently without a club. He is of Moluccan descent.

Club career
The son of a Moluccan father and a Dutch mother, he made his professional first team debut in 2007 with Eredivisie side FC Groningen under long-time head coach Ron Jans. Hiariej scored his first professional goal on 23 January 2008 in a match against NEC.

During his time at Groningen, Hiariej was sent on loan twice; to Emmen and Cambuur. In May 2017, he moved to Australia to play in Gosford for the Central Coast Mariners. After practicing with the first team for a few weeks, he signed another one-year contract with Emmen in July 2019. He left the club at the expiration of his contract, after losing his starting spot to Hilal Ben Moussa.

International career
Hiarej is also a Dutch youth international; he played a number of matches for several youth teams. He was also part of the Netherlands under-17 team, who ended up third in the 2005 FIFA U-17 World Championship.

Netherlands under-17 coach, Ruud Kaiser was very impressed by the young defender. Before the youth FIFA U-17 World Cup in Peru, Kaiser said about Hiariej: "When Hiariej plays for his club, he plays central defender, but here he plays right-back. He is talented and quick. He also has the qualities to come up in attack; he sees the chances".

Hiariej would also make appearances for the Netherlands under-21 team.

Honours
Groningen
 KNVB Cup: 2014–15

Netherlands U17
 FIFA U-17 World Championship: third place 2005

References

External links
 

1988 births
Living people
People from Winschoten
Dutch people of Indonesian descent
Dutch footballers
Eredivisie players
Eerste Divisie players
FC Emmen players
FC Groningen players
SC Cambuur players
Central Coast Mariners FC players
Netherlands under-21 international footballers
Netherlands youth international footballers
Dutch expatriate footballers
Expatriate soccer players in Australia
Association football midfielders
Footballers from Groningen (province)
Dutch expatriate sportspeople in Australia